Jalžabet is a village and municipality in Croatia in Varaždin County. 

According to the 2011 census, there are 3,615 inhabitants, in the following settlements:
 Imbriovec Jalžabetski, population 329
 Jakopovec, population 485
 Jalžabet, population 1,066
 Kaštelanec, population 411
 Kelemen, population 584
 Leštakovec, population 263
 Novakovec, population 456
 Pihovec, population 21

The absolute majority of population are Croats.

References

Municipalities of Croatia
Populated places in Varaždin County